Grasmück is a German surname. Notable people with the surname include:

Günter Grasmück, Austrian musician
Jürgen Grasmück (1940–2007), German writer

German-language surnames